Lenka is the debut studio album by Australian recording artist Lenka. It was released on 23 September 2008 by Epic Records. The first single, "The Show", was released on 15 June 2009.

Singles
"The Show" was released to digital retailers on 6 September 2008 as the album's lead single. The song had moderate success, peaking at number 25 on the US Billboard Adult Pop Songs chart, and at number 65 on the ARIA Singles Chart in Australia.

"Trouble Is a Friend" was released to digital retailers as the album's second and final single on 1 September 2009. It failed to match the success of its predecessor, peaking at number 65 on the German Singles Chart.

Track listing

Charts

Certifications

Credits and personnel
Credits for Lenka adapted from Barnes & Noble.

Performance Credits

Lenka - Primary Artist, Percussion, Piano, Glockenspiel, Keyboards, Vocals, Vibes
Keith Ciancia - Drums, Keyboards
Luis Conte - Percussion
Larry Corbett - Cello
Joel Derouin - Strings, Violin
Armen Garabedian - Violin
Mark Goldenberg - Bass
Victor Indrizzo - Drums
Roland Kato - Viola
Trevor Lawrence - Drums
Danny Levin - Trombone, Trumpet, Vocals
Pierre Marchand - Bass, Accordion
Josefina Vergara - Violin
John Alagia - Acoustic Guitar
Sean Hurley - Bass
Joey Waronker - Drums
Stuart Brawley - Organ, Piano, Keyboards, Vocals, Bells, Timpani, Vibes
Mike Elizondo - Acoustic Guitar, Bass, Electric Guitar, Keyboards, Mellotron, Vibes
Maxime St-Pierre - Horn
Joe Corcoran - Guitar, Percussion, Vocals, Moog Synthesizer

Zac Rae - Piano, Keyboards
Howie Day - Vocals, Guest Appearance
Paz Lenchantin - Violin
Philip Vaiman - Violin
Adam MacDougall - Piano, Keyboards
Ana Lenchantin - Cello
Missy Higgins - Vocals
Lester Nuby - Drums
Tereza Stanislav - Strings, Violin
Jason Reeves - Vocals
Aaron Sterling - Drums
Pascal Shefteshy - Guitar
Wes Precourt - Violin
Mario de León - Violin, Concert Master
Matthew Funes - Viola
Daniel Thouin - Organ, Piano
James Gulliver Hancock - Vocals
Dave Kostiner - Vocals
Jean Philippe Goncalves - Drums
Maxime Saint Pierre - Trumpet, Horn
Dan Thouin - Organ, Piano
Brian Macleod - Drums
Keefus Ciancia	- Keyboards

Technical Credits

Dan Burns - Composer
Greg Calbi - Mastering
Ted Jensen - Mastering
Pierre Marchand - Producer, Engineer, Audio Production
Brian Scheuble - Engineer
John Alagia - Producer, Audio Production
Suzie Katayama - String Contractor
Stuart Brawley - Arranger, Composer, Producer, Engineer, Horn Arrangements, Audio Production
Mike Elizondo - Programming, Producer, Audio Production
Pierre Girard - Engineer

Joe Corcoran - Programming, Engineer
Billy Mohler - Composer
Jason Lader - Producer, Engineer, Audio Production
Jason Reeves - Composer
Thomas Salter - Composer
Sheri Lee - Art Direction
Pascal Shefteshy - Engineer
David Paul Campbell - String Arrangements
Lenka - Composer
David Campbell - Arranger

References

External links
inthenews.co.uk
Lenka (Decoder Ring) Releases S/T Solo Debut 9/23 (NeuFutur magazine)
Review at Contactmusic.com

2008 debut albums
Lenka albums
Albums produced by Mike Elizondo
Epic Records albums